The Brady Bunch is a sitcom created by Sherwood Schwartz. The show follows Mike Brady (Robert Reed), a widowed architect with sons Greg (Barry Williams), Peter (Christopher Knight) and Bobby (Mike Lookinland). Mike marries Carol Martin (Florence Henderson), whose daughters from her previous marriage are Marcia (Maureen McCormick), Jan (Eve Plumb) and Cindy (Susan Olsen). They all move into the house designed by Mike in Los Angeles' suburbs. Also living with them is the housekeeper, Alice (Ann B. Davis), and the dog, Tiger. Some episodes tended to center on the kids' misadventures that often led to Mike and Carol steering the kids in the right direction.

The series premiered on ABC on September 26, 1969. The series ran for five seasons, with all 117 episodes originally airing on Fridays. The series ran in the 8 p.m. U.S. Eastern time slot, with the exception of season two, which aired at 7:30 p.m. Throughout its original run The Brady Bunch received mainly negative reviews and never broke into the Nielsen top 30. However, the ratings were solid enough for the show to remain on the air for five seasons, peaking at #31 in its third season. Ratings began to dip in season five, and in order to boost viewership of its much-needed younger audience, Schwartz introduced a new character: the Bradys' cousin Oliver (Robbie Rist) late in the season. Schwartz's plan failed, and the series was canceled before the start of the 1974 fall season.

Of the nine main cast members, only Florence Henderson, Ann B. Davis, and Barry Williams appear in all 117 episodes. Robert Reed does not appear in two episodes ("Goodbye, Alice, Hello" in season 4, and the final episode of the series). Each of the other five Brady kids is absent from one of five different episodes during season two. The show also featured a number of guest stars of that era, such as Davy Jones, Desi Arnaz Jr., Vincent Price, Joe Namath and Deacon Jones; of these, only Vincent Price did not play himself.

The episodes aired on ABC in an order different from when they were produced. When put into syndication, the episodes began airing in the order in which they were made. On the DVD releases, all the episodes are in the order in which they originally aired.

Series overview

Episodes

Season 1 (1969–70)

Season 2 (1970–71)

Season 3 (1971–72)

Season 4 (1972–73)

Season 5 (1973–74)

Home media
 Warner Home Video - February 17, 2015 (Blu-ray)
 Paramount Pictures - TBA (DVD & Blu-ray)

References

Lists of American sitcom episodes
The Brady Bunch